Sabbath in Paradise is a documentary film by Claudia Heuermann examining contemporary Jewish musical culture in New York's avant garde Jazz scene in the 1990s. It features concert footage and interviews with Anthony Coleman, Marc Ribot, Andy Statman, David Krakauer, Frank London, John Zorn and others.

References

External links 
 

1997 films
German documentary films
Documentary films about Jews and Judaism in the United States
Culture of New York City
Documentary films about jazz music and musicians
1997 documentary films
Jewish music
Jewish American culture
Jews and Judaism in New York City
Documentary films about New York City
1990s English-language films
1990s German films